Joseph Kobzon (1937-2018), Soviet and Russian singer.
 (3399 Kobzon), a minor planet named after the singer.